The following highways are numbered 319:

Brazil
 BR-319

Canada
 Manitoba Provincial Road 319
 Prince Edward Island Route 319

China
 China National Highway 319

Costa Rica
 National Route 319

Germany
 Bundesstraße 319

India
 National Highway 319 (India)

Japan
 Japan National Route 319

United Kingdom
 A319 road

United States
  U.S. Route 319
  Arkansas Highway 319
  Connecticut Route 319
  Georgia State Route 319 (former)
  Indiana State Road 319 (former)
  Louisiana Highway 319
  Maryland Route 319 (former)
  Montana Secondary Highway 319
  Nevada State Route 319
  New York State Route 319 (former)
  Ohio State Route 319
  Pennsylvania Route 319 (former)
  Puerto Rico Highway 319
  South Carolina Highway 319
  Tennessee State Route 319
 Texas:
  Texas State Highway 319 (former)
  Texas State Highway Loop 319 (former)
  Farm to Market Road 319
  Utah State Route 319
  Virginia State Route 319
  Wyoming Highway 319
  Wyoming Highway 319 Spur (unsigned)